Tumor-associated glycoprotein 72 (TAG-72) is a glycoprotein found on the surface of many cancer cells, including ovary, breast, colon, lung, and pancreatic cancers. It is a mucin-like molecule with a molar mass of over 1000 kDa.

TAG-72 is a tumor marker measured with radioimmunoassays like CA 72-4, which uses the monoclonal antibodies indium (111In) satumomab pendetide and iodine (125I) minretumomab. This assay has a good specificity for gastric cancer, with a correlation to the neoplasia's extension. It is used to identify relapses of the disease and to follow up the treatment.

TAG-72 is also the target of the anti-cancer drugs anatumomab mafenatox and minretumomab.

References

Glycoproteins
Tumor markers